King's Castle (Ulster Scots: Käng's Kessel) is a castle in Ardglass, County Down, Northern Ireland. It was originally built in the 12th century and additions were made at various times over the centuries. It was rebuilt in the 19th century to the original specifications after parts of it collapsed in 1830 during repairs to the castle's foundation: restoration finished in 1988 and the castle opened as a nursing home and remains one today.

History
The Dublin Penny Journal of 30 March 1833 describes King's Castle as follows:

See also 
Castles in Northern Ireland

References

External links
 

Buildings and structures completed in the 12th century
Castles in County Down
Ardglass